This list identifies the legislation governing underwater diving activities listed by region. Some legislation affects only professional diving, other may affect only recreational diving, or all diving activities. The list includes primary and delegated legislation, and international standards for the conduct of diving adopted by national states, but does not include legislation or standards relating to manufacture or testing of diving equipment.

Argentina

Australia

Queensland

Austria

Canada

Quebec

Denmark and Greenland

France

Germany

Israel

Italy

Sicily

Maldives

Malta

The Netherlands

Norway

South Africa

Sweden

Switzerland

United Kingdom

United States

Exemptions
Scientific diving
Search and Rescue (some states, only when there is a reasonable expectation of rescuing a survivor)

References

Underwater diving safety
Underwater diving